The nasofrontal duct is a duct connecting the infundibulum and frontal sinus. 

A true nasofrontal duct only exists in 15% of the population.

Some sources prefer the term "frontal recess".

References

Human head and neck